Johann Simon Buchholz (27 September 1758 – 24 February 1825) was a German organ builder.

Life 
Born in Schloßvippach, Buchholz learned his trade from Adam Heinrich Rietze in Magdeburg, from his later brother-in-law Johann Wilhelm Grüneberg in Brandenburg and from Ernst Julius Marx in Berlin. There, Buchholz founded his own workshop in 1790. He is considered one of the most important Prussian organ builders and built over 30 organs.

Buchholz married Dorothea Sophia Meier, the youngest daughter of the Brandenburg bookbinder Johann Anton Peter Meier, on 25 November 1788. The wedding took place in the house of his brother-in-law Johann Wilhelm Grüneberg. Their son Carl August Buchholz also became an organ builder. Johann Simon Buchholz built 19 organs in the years 1812 to 1825 together with his son Carl August.

Buchholz died in Berlin at the age of 66.

Work 
Simon built the organs listed below (sorted alphabetically by place name) between 1812 and 1825 together with his son Carl August. The source references refer on the one hand to the information on the location, place, year of construction, original condition and on the other hand to the whereabouts and condition:

References

Further reading 
 
 
 
 Wolf Bergelt: Orgelreisen durch die Mark Brandenburg. BoD – Books on Demand, 2017, 

German pipe organ builders
1758 births
1825 deaths
People from Sömmerda (district)